Hickleton is a civil parish in the metropolitan borough of Doncaster, South Yorkshire, England.  The parish contains 28 listed buildings that are recorded in the National Heritage List for England.  Of these, one is listed at Grade I, the highest of the three grades, three are at Grade II*, the middle grade, and the others are at Grade II, the lowest grade.  The parish contains the village of Hickleton and the surrounding area, and all the listed buildings are in the village.  The most important buildings are the church, which is listed at Grade I, and the country house of Hickleton Hall, listed at Grade II*  Also listed are structures associated with the church, and buildings and items in the grounds and gardens of the hall.  The other listed buildings include houses, cottages and associated structures, a farmhouse, farm buildings, a memorial cross, a dovecote, a former school, a smithy, and a telephone kiosk.


Key

Buildings

References

Citations

Sources

 

Lists of listed buildings in South Yorkshire
Buildings and structures in the Metropolitan Borough of Doncaster